East St. Louis School District 189 is a public school district headquartered in the city of East St. Louis, Illinois, United States.

In addition to East St. Louis, the district also serves portions of Canteen, Centreville, and Stites Townships in northwestern St. Clair County.

History

The non-high school district 202, which included the elementary school districts 182 and 184, was dissolved in July 1956. The area from this district was divided between the East St. Louis school district and the Cahokia Unit School District 187, and therefore the East St. Louis district took students of all grade levels from the former 202 district. The East St. Louis district received around 66% of the students and around 66% of the District 182's assessed valuation. The East St. Louis acquired the three District 182 elementary schools: JMD Brown, Garrison, and LaFayette. The Cahokia district received the remaining students and assessed valuation.

Schools
Schools are located in the city of East St. Louis unless otherwise noted.

High school
East St. Louis Senior High School

Middle schools
Lincoln Middle School
Mason-Clark Middle School

Elementary schools
Avant Elementary School (Washington Park)
Bush Elementary School
Dunbar Elementary School
Officer Elementary School
Wright Elementary School

Others
Vivian Adams Early Childhood Center
Wyvetter Younge Alternative Center
James E. Williams Sr. Learning Center 
Washington Elementary

Former schools
 East St. Louis Lincoln High School
 Hawthorne Elementary School
 Rock Junior High School
 Hughes-Quinn Junior High
 Manners Elementary School (Washington Park)
 Neely Elementary School (Alorton)
 Woodrow Wilson Elementary School (Washington Park)
 Nelson Mandela Elementary School (East St. Louis)
 Jackson Math & Science Academy
 Lilly Freeman Elementary School
 King Jr. High School
 Kennedy Elementary
 Bluff View Elementary
 Lansdowne Jr. High School
 Alta Sita Elementary
 Miles Davis Elementary
 Longfellow Elementary

See also

List of school districts in Illinois

References

External links

 – Official site. (Archive of estlps189.net)
 – Official site (Archive of estlouis.stclair.k12.il.us)

School districts in Illinois
Education in St. Clair County, Illinois
Education in Madison County, Illinois